Jesse Witherspoon Gage (October 12, 1882 – January 18, 1953) was an American football player and coach.  He served as the head football coach  Massachusetts Agricultural College—now the University of Massachusetts Amherst—in 1909. He compiled a 1–6–2 record that season.

Head coaching record

References

1882 births
1953 deaths
Dartmouth Big Green football coaches
Dartmouth Big Green football players
UMass Minutemen football coaches
People from Barrington, New Hampshire
Players of American football from New Hampshire
Sportspeople from Strafford County, New Hampshire